Muslim Football Club is a Pakistani football club based in Chaman, Balochistan that competes in Pakistan Premier League. The players are semi-professional, most having another source of income besides playing for the team.

History

Formation and promotion
The club was formed in 2010 in Quetta, Balochistan, and entered Football Federation League, the second division of Pakistani football. In 2010–11 Pakistan Football Federation League, the club was placed in Super League with local rivals Afghan Sports and Baloch Quetta, along with University Football Club and Wohaib. The club won their first ever professional game defeating University Football Club 1–0. In their second and third match, the club defeated local rivals Afghan Sports and Baloch Quetta 3–2 and 3–0 respectively. The club finished their last group stage match in a 1–1 draw against Wohaib. The club topped their group and earned promotion to 2011–12 Pakistan Premier League. On 15 December 2010, the club faced winner of departmental leg, Pakistan Police to determine the winner of 2010–11 Pakistan Football Federation League. Muslim lost the match 2–1, the club's striker Saeed Ahmed scored 4 goals in 5 appearances.

In 2017, Muslim Football Club defeated Chashma Green to win the All Pakistan Peace Tournament.

Players

Current squad

Competitive record
The club's competitive record since the 2010–11 season are listed below.

Notable players
 Saeed Ahmed

Honours
All Pakistan Peace Tournament: 2017

References

See also
Afghan FC Chaman

Football clubs in Pakistan
Football in Chaman
Association football clubs established in 2010
2010 establishments in Pakistan